The Erieye radar system is an Airborne Early Warning and Control System (AEW&C) developed by Saab Electronic Defence Systems (formerly Ericsson Microwave Systems) of Sweden. It uses active electronically scanned array (AESA) technology. The Erieye is used on a variety of aircraft platforms, such as the Saab 340 and Embraer R-99. It has recently been implemented on the Bombardier Global 6000 aircraft as the GlobalEye.

The Erieye Ground Interface Segment (EGIS; not to be confused with the Aegis combat system) is a major component of the software used by the Erieye system.

The radar provides 300 degree coverage and has an instrumental range of 450 km and detection range of 350 km in a dense hostile electronic warfare environment—in heavy radar clutter and at low target altitudes. In addition to this, the radar is also capable of identifying friends or foes, and has a sea surveillance mode.

The Erieye system has full interoperability with NATO air defence command and control systems.

History

In 1985 Ericsson Microwave Systems were contracted by the Swedish Defence Material Administration to develop what would become the PS-890 Erieye AEW radar. In the same year a dummy dual-sided phased array antenna was tested on a twin-engined Fairchild Metro aircraft. In 1987 the Metro aircraft was fitted with the radar system for flight trials. Production of the radar started in 1993 following an order for six radars for the Swedish Air Force for fitment in Saab 340 aircraft. The first two production radars were delivered in 1996.
The name Erieye is short for Ericsson eye.

Operational history

Pakistan 

In February of 2019, the Pakistan Air Force launched retaliatory airstrikes on Indian military installations at Indian Administered Jammu and Kashmir in response to India's violation of Pakistani airspace and the bombing of a wooded area at Balakot. While fighter jets from various PAF squadrons executed the airstrikes, Saab-2000 Erieye AWACS along with DA-20 EW supported them throughout the operation.

Design
 

The Erieye AEW&C mission system radar is an active, phased-array, pulse-doppler sensor that can feed an onboard operator architecture or downlink data (via an associated datalink subsystem) to a ground-based air defence network. The system employs a large aperture, dual-sided antenna array housed in a dorsal 'plank' fairing. The antenna is fixed, and the beam is electronically scanned, which provides for improved detection and significantly enhanced tracking performance compared with radar-dome antenna systems. Outside these sectors, performance is reduced in forward and aft directions.

Other system features include:
Adaptive waveform generation (including digital, phase-coded pulse compression); 
Signal processing and target tracking; 
track while scan (TWS); 
low side lobe values (throughout the system's angular coverage); 
low- and medium-pulse repetition frequency operating modes; 
frequency agility; Air-to-air and sea surveillance modes; and 
target radar cross-section display.

The radar operates as a medium- to high-PRF pulse-Doppler, solid-state radar, in E/F-band (3 GHz), incorporating 192 two-way transmit/receive modules that combine to produce a pencil beam, steered as required within the operating 150° sector each side of the aircraft (one side at a time). It is understood that Erieye has some ability to detect aircraft in the 30° sectors fore and aft of the aircraft heading, but has no track capability in this sector.

Development
GlobalEye consists of a suite of sensors using Erieye ER (Extended Range) radar and mission system, installed in the Bombardier Global 6000 long-range business jet.

Operators

 Brazilian Air Force — Embraer R-99

 Hellenic Air Force — Formerly on Saab 340 now on EMB-145H (Embraer R-99) airframe

 Mexican Air Force — Embraer R-99
 

 Pakistan Air Force — Saab E-2000

 Royal Saudi Air Force — Saab E-2000

 Swedish Air Force — Saab 340

 Royal Thai Air Force — Saab 340

 United Arab Emirates Air Force — Saab 340, Global 6000

Applications
 Embraer R-99 (EMB-145)
 GlobalEye, AEW&C solution on the Bombardier Global 6000
 Saab 340 AEW&C
 Saab 2000
 Fairchild Swearingen Metroliner (trials)

References

External links
 
 
 
 
 
 

Aircraft radars
Military radars of Sweden
Ericsson
Saab